Petri Ilari Walli (February 25, 1969 – June 28, 1995) was the founder, vocalist, guitar-player, songwriter and producer of the Finnish psychedelic rock-band Kingston Wall.

Petri was born in Finland, his brother is Aki Walli. He also have half-brother Hasse Walli who is a Finnish guitarist.

Petri (aka Pete) founded the band called Kingston Wall in 1987, and he was the spirit behind the whole band. They came out with three albums in 1992, 1993 and 1994, and broke up in December the same year as the last album was released. The break-up was Walli's idea, as he wanted Kingston Wall to be on a hiatus for an unspecified time. After the break-up Petri travelled to Goa, India, where he had been many times before with his friend Ior Bock. (There is not much written text about Petri's and Ior's friendship, so nobody knows exactly how good friends they were). Petri ended his life by jumping off the balcony of the Töölö Church in Töölö, Helsinki the following summer. Walli was later buried in the Hietaniemi Cemetery, only about one kilometer away from his place of death.

Petri was a mysterious person who loved the eastern culture, philosophy, Scandinavian mythologies and most of all, playing guitar.
There have been numerous rumours and speculation about the reasons of his suicide. Some say that he committed suicide because of his failed relationship with a Finnish girl called Tanja or Tanya, others say that he was in a spiritual turmoil which reflected on the lyrics and themes on Kingston Wall's last album, Tri-Logy. The song "For All Mankind" from Tri-Logy is considered by many to be Walli's suicide note.

Petri's co-musicians in Kingston Wall were Jukka Jylli (bass) and Sami Kuoppamäki (drums). Sometimes they had guest musicians  performing on their albums and live shows, such as Sakari Kukko (saxophone) and Kimmo Kajasto (synth). Drummers Petteri Ståhl and Timo "Tinde" Joutsimäki played drums in Kingston Wall before Kuoppamäki joined the group.

References

1969 births
1995 suicides
20th-century Finnish male singers
Finnish male guitarists
Suicides by jumping in Finland
20th-century guitarists
Burials at Hietaniemi Cemetery
1995 deaths